Chiang Sheng was a martial arts actor, one of the Venom Mob, renowned for their acrobatic and martial arts skills. He joined the Chang Cheh's Cohorts as an actor, and also worked with Chang Cheh as an assistant director and choreographer. Along with Alexander Fu Sheng, Chiang Sheng was one of the Chang Cheh's favorites.

Biography 
Chiang Sheng was born in Taiwan in 1951. His family was too large and his parents could not take care of all the children, therefore he was sent to the Fu Sheng Drama School in Taipei, Taiwan. Chiang Sheng met his lifelong friends like Lu Feng, Kuo Chui and Robert Tai in the school.
He was a boy of vivid and somewhat mischievous nature and eventually was expelled from school for smoking in the principal's office. But he had learned enough to start working as a stuntman.

In the mid 70's the renowned Shaw Brothers Studio's director Chang Cheh went to Taiwan looking for new talents. He met Chiang Sheng, Kuo Chui and Lu Feng there. In the 1976 those three together with Lo Mang took part in their pre-starting movie Shaolin Temple (not to be confused with the movie with the same title released in 1982 starring Jet Li). Two years later, in 1978, Chang Cheh presented the film Five Venoms, starring Chiang Sheng, Kuo Chui, Lu Feng, Lo Mang, Sun Chien and Wei Pai. All of them were still newcomers in HK movie industry, Chang Cheh didn't include any great stars of the time in the cast, introducing new faces to the audience and the new formula of martial art movies - in this and subsequent movies not only one hero fights well, but any person of the main cast has his own style and great ability to fight.

The movie had a great success in Hong Kong and also in the West. Since then the first five actors are known as "Venoms". (Wei Pai played The Snake, but he is referred as "sixth venom" because he took part only in a few subsequent "venom" movies, while Chiang Sheng became an integral part of the troupe. He played a disciple learning all five styles and referred as the "hybrid venom" )
The team continued with the formula. Chiang Sheng, Kuo Chui and Lu Feng, all with Chinese opera background, became action directors for Chang Cheh's movies. Soon Chiang Sheng also started working as an assistant director. The cast, including the Five venoms, and also Wong Lik, Yu Tai-Ping, Johnny Wang, Ku Feng, sometimes together with Alexander Fu Sheng, Ti Lung and others, appeared in more than a dozen films. Among them there are "kung fu classic" like Crippled Avengers, Shaolin Rescuers, Legend of the Fox, The Rebel Intruders, filled with great martial art performance and wuxia entourage. Chiang Sheng could not only enrich the movie with breathtaking acrobatic exercise, but also bring the comic relief to it.

The Venom mob disbanded in 1981. Three of them Kuo Chui, Chiang Sheng and Lu Feng founded a new production company in Taiwan. Chiang Sheng acted and choreographed the action scenes in their debut film Ninja in the Deadly Trap (a.k.a. Ruthless Tactics)

Soon, Kuo Chui went back to Hong Kong and wanted Chiang Sheng to go with him, but Chiang Sheng's wife insisted on his staying in Tawan. Chiang Sheng could not get a worthwhile job in Taiwan, and later divorced his wife. He sank into depression and became a hard drinker.

In August 1991, an old friend of Chiang Sheng, Ricky Cheng Tien Chi, came to see him, but found him dead; he had been lying there for three days. He died from a heart attack, though Kuo Chui said "it was more of a broken heart".

Filmography

See also 
 Chang Cheh
 Venom Mob

References

External links 
 
 Chiang Sheng on HK Move Database
 Chiang Sheng on HK Cinemagic
 Memorial page for Chiang Sheng By Lily Gold
 Chang Cheh: the Godfather of the Kung Fu Film

1951 births
1991 deaths
Shaw Brothers Studio
Taiwanese male film actors
Taiwanese martial artists
20th-century Taiwanese male actors